PLR may refer to:

Political parties:
 Partito liberale-radicale svizzero, Italian name for the Free Democratic Party of Switzerland
 Partidul Liberal Reformator, Romanian title for the Liberal Reformist Party (Moldova)
 Partidul Liberal Reformator, Romanian title for the Liberal Reformist Party (Romania)
 Partido Liberal Radical or Radical Liberal Party (Paraguay) 
 PLR.Les Libéraux-Radicaux and PLR.I Liberali, French and Italian names respectively for FDP.The Liberals, a Swiss political party
Pour La Réunion, founded in 2012

Codes:
 ICAO airline designator for Northwestern Air
 IATA code for St. Clair County Airport, Pell City, Alabama, United States
 ISO 639-3 code for the Palaka language, spoken in Ivory Coast

Other uses:
 Pupillary light reflex of the eye
 Private letter ruling, US taxpayer guidance
 Public Lending Right, author payments for library book loans
 Pulse link repeater, a telecommunications device
 Point of local repair of a network in MPLS local protection
 Psycho+Logical-Records, an American record label
 WPLR or 99.1 PLR, a radio station, New Haven, Connecticut, US